Asmir Avdukić (born 13 May 1981) is a Bosnian former footballer who played as a goalkeeper.

Club career
Avdukić previously played for Kamen Ingrad in the Croatian Prva HNL.
He had 19 clean sheets with FK Borac Banja Luka in 2010–11 season.

In February 2012, Avdukić moved to Persepolis, but he could not play in 2011–12 season. He played in 2012 AFC Champions League.

International career
Avdukić made his senior debut for Bosnia and Herzegovina in an April 2004 friendly match against Finland and has earned a total of 3 caps, scoring no goals. His final international was a February 2013 friendly against Slovenia.

Career statistics

Club

Honours

Player

Club
Travnik
First League of FBiH: 2006–07
 
Borac Banja Luka
Bosnian Premier League: 2010–11
Republika Srpska Cup: 2010–11
 
Radnik Bijeljina
Bosnian Cup: 2015–16
Republika Srpska Cup: 2015–16

References

External links

1981 births
Living people
People from Breza, Bosnia and Herzegovina
Association football goalkeepers
Bosniaks of Bosnia and Herzegovina
Bosnia and Herzegovina footballers
Bosnia and Herzegovina international footballers
2014 FIFA World Cup players
NK Čelik Zenica players
NK Kamen Ingrad players
NK Travnik players
FK Sloboda Tuzla players
FK Radnik Bijeljina players
FK Rudar Prijedor players
FK Borac Banja Luka players
Persepolis F.C. players
FK Željezničar Banja Luka players
Premier League of Bosnia and Herzegovina players
Croatian Football League players
First League of the Federation of Bosnia and Herzegovina players
First League of the Republika Srpska players
Bosnia and Herzegovina expatriate footballers
Expatriate footballers in Croatia
Bosnia and Herzegovina expatriate sportspeople in Croatia
Expatriate footballers in Iran
Bosnia and Herzegovina expatriate sportspeople in Iran